Tervel Municipality is a municipality (obshtina) in Dobrich Province, Northeastern Bulgaria, located in Southern Dobruja geographical region, about 30 km south of Danube river. It is named after its administrative centre - the town of Tervel.

More significant tourist sights in the area include the early Byzantine cave monasteries around the villages of Balik and Brestnitsa dating to the 5th-6th century.

Settlements 

Tervel Municipality includes the following 26 places; all of them are villages:

Demography 
The municipality has a mixed population consisting mostly of Bulgarians (45.8% according to 2001 census data), Turks (40.7%) and Romani (12.9%).

The following table shows the change of the population during the last four decades.

Religion
According to the latest Bulgarian census of 2011, the religious composition, among those who answered the optional question on religious identification, was the following:

See also
Provinces of Bulgaria
Municipalities of Bulgaria
List of cities and towns in Bulgaria

References

External links
 Tervel municipality website 

Municipalities in Dobrich Province